Violet Road is a Norwegian folk and rock band from Tromsø who sing mainly in English. The band is made up of five members, the three brothers Håkon, Hogne, Halvard and Kjetil Holmstad-Solberg and Espen Høgmo.

Earlier also another brother, Herman Rundberg.

Discography

Albums

Singles
2010: "Crazy as Can Be"
2011: "Can You Hear the Morning Singing"
2012: "Burning Up"
2013: "Last Days In India"
2014: "Face Of The Moon"
2014: "People Of The Sun"
2015: "We Are The Love" 
2015: "Out Of Words" 
2018: "Monument"
2018: "Keep On Running"
2018: "Falling Stars" 
2018: "Always"
2019: "backseat babies"

Band members

References

External links
Official website
MySpace

Norwegian folk rock groups
Musical groups established in 2007
2007 establishments in Norway
Musical groups from Tromsø